Harris B. Gaines Sr. (1888 - 1964) was an American lawyer and politician in Illinois. He served in the Illinois House of Representatives from 1929 to 1935. Irene McCoy Gaines was his wife and they had two sons, Harris Gaines Jr. and Charles Gaines.

Gaines was born in Henderson, Kentucky. He moved with his family to Chicago and studied at Depauw University. John Marshall Law School, and the University of Chicago. His wife worked as a stenographer and then a social worker. She was a leader in various civic groups and for the Idlewild owners association. The Chicago History Museum has a collection of her papers.

References

1888 births
1964 deaths
People from Henderson, Kentucky
DePauw University alumni
John Marshall Law School (Chicago) alumni
Members of the Illinois House of Representatives
Lawyers from Chicago
University of Chicago alumni
20th-century African-American politicians
20th-century American politicians
African-American lawyers
20th-century American lawyers
African-American state legislators in Illinois
African-American men in politics